Kaine Baldwin is an Australian rules footballer who plays for the Essendon Football Club in the Australian Football League (AFL). He joined the club during the Supplemental Selection Period prior to the 2021 season. He had previously captained South Australia's under-16 team and earned All-Australian honours. He made his senior debut for Essendon against Geelong in round 1 of the 2022 season. His parents are Helen Baldwin and Andrew Baldwin, and has one sibling, Cody Baldwin.

References

External links
Kaine Baldwin from AFL Tables

Essendon Football Club players
2002 births
Living people